Richard Cevantis Carrier (born December 1, 1969) is an American atheist historian, author, and activist, whose work focuses on empiricism, atheism, and the historicity of Jesus.

A long-time contributor to skeptical websites, including The Secular Web and Freethought Blogs, Carrier has published a number of books and articles on philosophy and religion in classical antiquity, discussing the development of early Christianity from a skeptical viewpoint, and concerning religion and morality in the modern world. He has publicly debated a number of scholars on the historical basis of the Bible and Christianity. He is a prominent advocate of the theory that Jesus did not exist, which he has argued in a number of his works. Carrier's methodology and conclusions in this field have proven controversial and unconvincing to most ancient historians, and he and his theories are often identified as fringe.

Background
In his autobiographical essay, "From Taoist to Infidel", Carrier discusses his upbringing in a benign Methodist church, his conversion to Taoism in early adulthood, his confrontation with Christian fundamentalists while in the United States Coast Guard, and his deeper study of religion, Christianity, and Western philosophy, which eventually led to his embrace of naturalism. From 1995 to 2015, he was married to Jennifer Robin Carrier.  Announcing their divorce, Carrier revealed that he is polyamorous, and that after informing his wife of his extramarital affairs, the last two years of their marriage had been an open relationship.

In 2008, Carrier received a doctorate in ancient history from Columbia University, where he studied the history of science in antiquity. His thesis was entitled "Attitudes Towards the Natural Philosopher in the Early Roman Empire (100 B.C. to 313 A.D.)." He has published several articles and chapters in books on the subject of history and philosophy.

For a number of years, Carrier was editor of and a substantial contributor to The Secular Web, where he wrote on the topics of atheism and metaphysical naturalism; these later formed the basis for his book Sense and Goodness without God. He also authored a regular column on the web site Freethought Blogs; this was suspended in 2016 amid allegations of sexual misconduct.  Carrier has frequently been a featured speaker at various skeptic, secular humanist, freethought and atheist conventions, such as the annual Freethought Festival in Madison, Wisconsin, the annual Skepticon convention in Springfield, Missouri, and conventions sponsored by American Atheists.

Carrier strongly advocated for a movement in atheism called "Atheism Plus," through which he argued that the atheist community ought to also share certain particular political agendas, not just lack a belief in God. Philosopher Massimo Pigliucci criticized Carrier for being very intolerant of people who disagreed with him or his atheistic views and for radicalizing the "Atheism plus" agenda. Pigliucci also quoted the originator of the "Atheism plus", Jen McCreight, criticizing Carrier: "Finally had time 2 read Richard Carrier's #atheismplus piece. His language was unnecessarily harsh, divisive & ableist. Doesn't represent A+."

In recent years, Carrier has been accused of engaging in unwanted sexual advances at skeptic and atheist conventions.  Carrier has both apologized for and denied the alleged misconduct.

Public debates and other media
Carrier has engaged in several formal debates, both online and in person, on a range of subjects, including naturalism, natural explanations of early Christian resurrection accounts, the morality of abortion, and the general credibility of the Bible. He debated Michael R. Licona on the Resurrection of Jesus at the University of California, Los Angeles on April 19, 2004. Carrier debated atheist Jennifer Roth online on the morality of abortion. He has defended naturalism in formal debates with Tom Wanchick and Hassanain Rajabali. He has debated David Marshall on the general credibility of the New Testament. His debates on the historicity of Jesus have included professor of religious studies Zeba A. Crook, Christian scholars Dave Lehman and Doug Hamp.

The March 18, 2009 debate Did Jesus Rise from the Dead? with William Lane Craig was held at the Northwest Missouri State University and posted online in two parts by ReasonableFaithOrg (YouTube channel). Prior to the debate, Carrier commented that "I originally insisted we first debate [on the topic] Are the Gospels Historically Reliable? for the simple reason that you can't honestly debate the former until you've debated (and in fact settled) the latter." In his post debate commentary, Carrier argued that Craig "focused almost entirely on protecting the Gospels as historical sources, and it was there that his shotgun of arguments got well ahead of my ability to catch up."  Another debate with Craig was broadcast on Lee Strobel's television show Faith Under Fire.

The October 25, 2014 debate Did Jesus Exist? with Trent Horn was held in San Diego, California, and posted online by the "MABOOM Show" (YouTube channel).
A debate with Craig A. Evans, entitled Did Jesus Exist? was held at Kennesaw State University on April 13, 2016, and posted online by KSUTV.

In 2006, Carrier was the keynote speaker for the Humanist Community of Central Ohio's annual Winter Solstice Banquet, where he spoke on defending naturalism as a philosophy.  Carrier appears in Roger Nygard's 2009 documentary The Nature of Existence, in which persons of different religious and secular philosophies are interviewed about the meaning of life.

In 2007, famed English philosopher Antony Flew, who had long advocated atheism in the absence of empirical evidence of divinity, published his final book with co-author  Roy Varghese, There Is a God: How the World's Most Notorious Atheist Changed His Mind. Flew espoused the position that there was an intelligent creator, thereby embracing the concept of deism.  Carrier wrote to Flew, and discussed the philosopher's supposed conversion on The Secular Web.  In Carrier's analysis he came up with an incorrect theory that There Is a God was authored primarily by Varghese, and misrepresented Flew's opinion regarding religion.  Without addressing Carrier directly, Flew released a rebutting statement through his publisher: "My name is on the book and it represents exactly my opinions. I would not have a book issued in my name that I do not 100 percent agree with. I needed someone to do the actual writing because I'm 84 and that was Roy Varghese's role. This is my book and it represents my thinking."

Publications
Carrier's best-known works concern the development of early Christianity and atheism as well as modern views of religion and philosophy.

Criticism of Hitler's Table Talk

In collaboration with Reinhold Mittschang, Carrier challenged several quotes attributed to Adolf Hitler, which were found in a collection of monologues known as Hitler's Table Talk in which he scourns Christianity. Carrier's paper argues that the French and English translations are "entirely untrustworthy", and suggests that translator François Genoud doctored portions of the text to enhance Hitler's views. Carrier put forward a new translation of twelve quotations, based on the German editions of Henry Picker and Werner Jochmann, as well as a fragment of the Bormann-Vermerke preserved at the Library of Congress, challenging some of the quotations frequently used to demonstrate Hitler's contempt for Christianity. Carrier concludes that Hitler's views in Table Talk "resemble Kant's with regard to the primacy of science over theology in deciding the facts of the universe, while remaining personally committed to a more abstract theism." Carrier also maintains that throughout the monologues, Hitler only derides Catholicism while "voicing many of the same criticisms one might hear from a candid (and bigoted) Protestant."

In a new foreword to Table Talk, Gerhard Weinberg comments that "Carrier has shown the English text of the table-talk that originally appeared in 1953 and is reprinted here derives from Genoud's French edition and not from one of the German texts." Derek Hastings cites Carrier's paper for "an attempt to undermine the reliability of the anti-Christian statements." Carrier's thesis that the English translation should be dispensed with entirely is rejected by Richard Steigmann-Gall, who while acknowledging the controversies raised by Carrier, "ultimately presume[d] its authenticity." Johnstone writes that Carrier only purports to show that four of the forty-two comments in Table Talks have been misrepresented, without discussing the rest and that for this reason, Johnstone contends that Carrier has been far from successful in demolishing the view of Hitler a non-Christian.

The empty tomb
In "The Spiritual Body of Christ and the Legend of the Empty Tomb", Carrier argues that the earliest Christians probably believed that Jesus received a new spiritual body in the resurrection, and that stories of his original body disappearing from his tomb were later embellishments. Alternatively, he suggests the possibility that Jesus' body was stolen or misplaced.  Carrier's analysis was criticized by philosophy professor Stephen T. Davis and Christian theologian Norman Geisler.

Science education in the Early Roman Empire
This was Carrier's dissertation with some expansion. Here he attempts to describe the Roman education system that pertained to the sciences and how Jews and Christians held different views, which set the stage for dark ages. Michiel Meeusen, in his review, states the work had issues such as "whiggism employed in dealing with ancient science and scientists."

The scientist in the Early Roman Empire
This book is a follow up to his dissertation "Science Education In The Early Roman Empire". Carrier argues that science in the Roman world was very advanced and progressive and would have reached a scientific revolution in a few more centuries had Christians not stepped in. In it he argues that Christians held back science for over a thousand years while ignoring or forgetting the scientific advancements of pagans. In Cristian Tolsa's review of the book, he notes that Carrier's view of science as essentially unaltered since Aristotle is a reductionist view that is inaccurate of the time period and that the book has "serious anachronisms". He also observes that Carrier fails to demonstrate the supposed stagnation of science from the Roman period to the modern period, but mainly assumes such is the case and relies on focusing on the advances made by pagans as enough to show that science really would have continued to grow indefinitely.

Historicity of Jesus
Earlier in his career, Carrier was not interested in the historicity of Jesus. His first thought was that it was a fringe theory, not worthy of academic inquiry; but a number of individuals requested that he investigate the subject, and raised money for him to do so.  Since then, Carrier has become a vocal advocate of the theory that Jesus was not a historical person.

In Not the Impossible Faith: Why Christianity Didn't Need a Miracle to Succeed (2009), Carrier writes on the social and intellectual context of the rise and early development of Christianity. Despite his initial skepticism of Christ myth theory, since late 2005 Carrier has considered it "very probable Jesus never actually existed as a historical person." In a blog entry from 2009, he writes "though I foresee a rising challenge among qualified experts against the assumption of historicity [of Jesus], as I explained, that remains only a hypothesis that has yet to survive proper peer review."

In Proving History: Bayes's Theorem and the Quest for the Historical Jesus (2012), Carrier describes the application of Bayes' theorem to historical inquiry in general, and the historicity of Jesus in particular.  According to Carrier, Bayes’ theorem is the standard to which all methodology for any historical study must adhere in order to be logically sound.  In his Bayesian analysis, the ahistoricity of Jesus is "true": that is, the "most probable" Bayesian conclusion.  By the same methodology, Carrier posits that Jesus originated in the realm of mythology, rather than as a historical person who was subsequently mythologized. Carrier argues that the probability of Jesus' existence is somewhere in the range of 1/3 to 1/12000, depending on the estimates used for the computation. A number of critics have rejected Carrier's ideas and methodology, calling it "tenuous", or "problematic and unpersuasive". Simon Gathercole writes that Carrier's arguments "are contradicted by the historical data."

In On the Historicity of Jesus: Why We Might Have Reason for Doubt (2014), Carrier continues to develop his Bayesian analysis of the historicity of Jesus. Carrier described his work as "the first comprehensive pro-Jesus-myth book ever published by a respected academic press and under formal peer review." The essence of his argument is that there is insufficient evidence, in the context of Bayesian probability, to believe in the historicity of Jesus.  Furthermore, Carrier posits that as a celestial figure, Jesus was probably known originally only through private revelations and hidden messages in scripture, which were then elaborated into an allegorical person, communicating the claims of the gospels.  The allegorical aspect of Jesus was then lost during the struggle for control of the Christian churches during the first century. Noting that the gospels were written decades after Jesus' death, Carrier claims that the gospels are "wildly fictitious", and proposes that the Gospel of Mark is really an extended meta-parable. He further claims that post-biblical writings mentioning Jesus should not be regarded as independent sources for his existence, since they may have relied on the gospels for their information.  Apart from the hero archetype pattern, Carrier contends that nothing else in the Gospels is reliable evidence for or against the historicity of Jesus.

Celestial Jesus
In 2002, Carrier reviewed the work of Earl Doherty, who posited that Jesus was originally a mythological being who subsequently came to be regarded as a historical person.  Carrier concluded that Doherty's theory was plausible, although at the time he had not yet concluded that this hypothesis was more probable than the historical Jesus.  He also criticized some of Doherty's points, which he considered untenable, although he regarded the basic concept as coherent and consistent with the evidence.  Over time, Carrier's views shifted to the point that he accepted Doherty's premise as the most likely explanation of Jesus.  He wrote, "It does soundly establish the key point that Jesus was regarded as a pre-existent incarnate divine being from the earliest recorded history of Christianity, even in fact before the writings of Paul, and that this was not even remarkable within Judaism."

Elaborating on this hypothesis, Carrier asserts that originally "Jesus was the name of a celestial being, subordinate to God, with whom some people hallucinated conversations", and that "The Gospel began as a mythic allegory about the celestial Jesus, set on earth, as most myths then were." Stories developed placing Jesus on Earth, and placing him in context with historical figures and places.  Subsequently, his worshipers came to believe that these allegories referred to a historical person.

Carrier asserts that the idea of a pre-Christian celestial being named "Jesus" is known from the writings of Philo of Alexandria on the Book of Zechariah. He argues that Philo's angelic being is identical to the Apostle Paul's Jesus: he is God's firstborn son, the celestial 'image of God', and God's agent of creation. However, Larry Hurtado contends that the figure named "Jesus" in Zechariah is a completely distinct figure, and that the Logos Philo discusses is not an angelic being at all.

In Carrier's view, Paul's reference in Romans 1:3 to Jesus being the "seed" of David describes his incarnation from a "cosmic sperm bank",  rather than the usual interpretation of Jesus as a descendant of David.  In Carrier's interpretation of Paul, Jesus possessed a surrogate human body, and thus the religious requirement of a blood sacrifice was fulfilled by his crucifixion by demons. Gathercole, however, notes that Paul's reference in Romans 1:3 is a common expression in the Septuagint, which simply refers to a "descendant", and that the theme of the descendants of David is common throughout the Old Testament. Carrier argues that like the school of early Jewish mysticism (100 BC– AD 1000), known as Merkabah mysticism, together with its views on the heavens and firmaments of creation, "Mythicism places the incarnation of Jesus below the heavens... being the whole vast region between the earth and the moon [the firmament], was well-established in both Jewish and pagan cosmology (see Element 37, Chapter 4, OHJ, pp. 184–193)."

Jewish and Hellenistic syncretism
Carrier notes four major trends in religion, occurring prior to the formation of Christianity: syncretism, the development of monotheism, the transformation of agricultural salvation cults into personal salvation cults, and cosmopolitanism.

Carrier writes that "Mithraism was a syncretism of Persian and Hellenistic elements; the Mysteries of Isis and Osiris were a syncretism of Egyptian and Hellenistic elements. Christianity is simply a continuation of the same trend: a syncretism of Jewish and Hellenistic elements. Each of these cults is unique and different from all the others in nearly every detail—but it's the general features they all share in common that reflect the overall fad that produced them in the first place, the very features that made them popular and successful within Greco-Roman culture." Furthermore, Carrier says;

Christianity, as a Jewish sect, began when someone (most likely Cephas, perhaps backed by his closest devotees) claimed this [celestial deity] "Jesus" had at last revealed that he had tricked the Devil by becoming incarnate and being crucified by the Devil (in the region of the heavens ruled by Devil), thereby atoning for all of Israel's sins...  It would be several decades later when subsequent members of this cult, after the world had not yet ended as claimed, started allegorizing the gospel of this angelic being. By placing him in earth history as a divine man, as a commentary on the gospel and its relation to society and the Christian mission.

Reception and criticism
On the Historicity of Jesus was positively reviewed by collaborator and fellow mythicist Raphael Lataster in the Journal of Religious History, who concurs that according to the gospels, "Jesus fits almost perfectly" the Rank-Raglan mythotype, and claims that there is "not a single confirmed historical figure" that conforms to the mythotype.

However, most contemporary scholarship has been critical of Carrier's methodology and conclusions. According to James F. McGrath, Carrier misuses Rank and Raglan and stretches their scales to make Jesus appear to score high on mythotype. According to Christopher Hansen, Carrier misuses and manipulates Raglan's scale to make Jesus appear more aligned with a mythotype by scoring him high, thus more mythical, when other scholars have scored Jesus as low, thus more historical. He argues that other scholars have assessed Jesus to be low on Raglan's scale and when Hansen looks at multiple other examples of historical figures he notes that "Historical figures regularly become Raglan heroes. They often score twelve or more points on the Raglan archetype" which casts doubts on the usefulness of the Raglan scale for historicity.

Both classicists and biblical scholars agree that there is a historical basis for a person called Jesus of Nazareth.  Writing in 2004, Michael Grant stated, "In recent years, 'no serious scholar has ventured to postulate the non-historicity of Jesus' or at any rate very few, and they have not succeeded in disposing of the much stronger, indeed very abundant, evidence to the contrary."  More recently, Patrick Gray posited, "That Jesus did in fact walk the face of the earth in the first century is no longer seriously doubted even by those who believe that very little about his life or death can be known with any certainty." For this reason, the views of Carrier and other proponents of the belief that a historical Jesus did not exist are frequently dismissed as "fringe theories" within classical scholarship.

Aviezer Tucker, previously an advocate of applying Bayesian techniques to history, expressed some sympathy for Carrier's view of the gospels, stating: "The problem with the Synoptic Gospels as evidence for a historical Jesus from a Bayesian perspective is that the evidence that coheres does not seem to be independent, whereas the evidence that is independent does not seem to cohere." However, Tucker argues that historians have been able to use theories about the transmission and preservation of information to identify reliable parts of the gospels. He says that "Carrier is too dismissive of such methods because he is focused on hypotheses about the historical Jesus rather than on the best explanations of the evidence."

New Testament scholar Bart Ehrman writes that Carrier is one of only two scholars with relevant graduate credentials who argues against the historicity of Jesus. Discussing Carrier's theory that some Jews believed in a "humiliated messiah" prior to the existence of Christianity, Ehrman criticizes Carrier for "idiosyncratic" readings of the Old Testament that ignore modern critical scholarship on the Bible. Ehrman concludes by saying "[w]e do not have a shred of evidence to suggest that any Jew prior to the birth of Christianity anticipated that there would be a future messiah who would be killed for sins—or killed at all—let alone one who would be unceremoniously destroyed by the enemies of the Jews, tortured and crucified in full public view. This was the opposite of what Jews thought the messiah would be." Ehrman has also publicly addressed Carrier's use of Bayes' Theorem, stating that "most historians simply don't think you can do history that way." He said he only knows of two historians who have used Bayes' Theorem, Carrier and Richard Swinburne, and noted the irony of the fact that Swinburne used it to prove Jesus was raised from the dead. Ehrman rejected both Carrier and Swinburne's conclusions, but conceded that he was unqualified to assess specifics about how they applied the theorem. "I'm not a statistician myself. I've had statisticians who tell me that both people are misemploying it, but I have no way of evaluating it."

Reviewing On the Historicity of Jesus, Daniel N. Gullotta says that Carrier has provided a "rigorous and thorough academic treatise that will no doubt be held up as the standard by which the Jesus Myth theory can be measured"; but he finds Carrier's arguments "problematic and unpersuasive", his use of Bayesian probabilities "unnecessarily complicated and uninviting", and he criticizes Carrier's "lack of evidence, strained readings and troublesome assumptions." Furthermore, he observed that using Bayes theorem in history seems useless, or at least unreliable, since it leads to absurd and contradictory results such as Carrier using it to come up with low probability for the existence of Jesus and scholar Richard Swinburne using it to come up with high probability that Jesus actually resurrected. Gullotta also says that there is absolutely no evidence whatsoever, either documentary or archaeological, that there was a period when Jews or Christians believed that Jesus only existed in heaven as a celestial being, which is Carrier's "foundational" thesis, rather than living as a human being on earth. Carrier is observed to constantly misinterpret and stretch sources and he also uses extensively fringe ideas like those of Dennis MacDonald on Homeric epics paralleling some of the Gospels, while downplaying the fact that MacDonald is still a historicist, not a mythicist. Gullotta also observes that Carrier relies on outdated and historically useless methods like Otto Rank and Lord Raglan's hero myth archetype events lists, which have been criticized and rejected by most scholars of folklore and mythology, in which Carrier alters the quantity and wording of these lists arbitrarily to his favor. Gullotta describes the belief that a historical Jesus never existed as a "fringe theory" that goes "unnoticed and unaddressed within scholarly circles".

Concerning the same book, Christina Petterson of the University of Newcastle writes, "Even if strictly correct, the methodology is tenuous.  In addition, the numbers and the statistics seem like a diversion or an illusionary tactic which intentionally confuse and obfuscate".  Unlike Gullotta, Petterson describes On the History of Jesus as somewhat amateurish: "Maths aside, nothing in the book shocked me, but seemed quite rudimentary first year New Testament stuff." With respect to Carrier's argument that the later tales of a historical Jesus should be studied for their literary and rhetorical purpose, and not for their historical content, Petterson says that this "reveals Carrier's ignorance of the field of New Testament studies and early Christianity."

M. David Litwa of Australian Catholic University, in a discussion of Carrier's work with a focus on On the Historicity of Jesus, notes that Carrier portrays himself "as a kind of crusader fighting for the truth of secular humanism", whose mission it is "to prove Christianity (or Carrier's understanding of it) wrong." He also notes that "Carrier's cavalier dismissal of the Bible and animosity toward the biblical deity would not seem to predispose him for careful biblical scholarship." Litwa describes Carrier as "on the fringes of the academic guild", although he is a trained scholar and does employ scholarly methods. Litwa goes on to argue against several arguments made by Carrier in On the Historicity of Jesus. Litwa writes that Carrier's application of the Rank-Raglan mythotype to Jesus relies on forced similarities and that "the pattern ignores major elements of [Jesus's] life." He also criticizes Carrier's attempts to derive Jesus from James Frazer's theory of the Near-Eastern dying-and-rising fertility god as relying on a "largely defunct" category in religious scholarship. He notes that few gods die and rise, usually staying dead in some way. Although Litwa acknowledges a parallel between the suffering experienced by dying deities and Jesus's suffering, he argues that pagan dying deities do not choose to die as Jesus does. Regarding Carrier's appeals to other ancient religious figures such as Romulus and the prophet Daniel who appear not to have existed, Litwa argues that Jesus is attested only twenty years after his death by Paul: "A name and a human character to go with it could not have been invented in this short period without invoking suspicion." Litwa dismisses Carrier's hypothesis that Paul's Jesus was an angelic being crucified on the celestial plane as relying on "baseless" speculation that the second-century Ascension of Isaiah was available to Paul and that its mention of Jesus's birth on earth and his crucifixion in Jerusalem are later additions, despite scholarship to the contrary.

Christopher Hansen observed that Carrier believes Jews already believed in a preexisting a supernatural son of God named Jesus based Philo's interpretation Zech. 6.12. However, Hansen observes that his argument relies on weak arguments and no evidence. He states, following Daniel Gullota, "there is not a single instance of a recorded celestial angel or Logos figure named Jesus/Joshua in ancient Jewish literature."

Professor Emeritus Larry Hurtado of the University of Edinburgh writes that, contrary to Carrier's claims, Philo of Alexandria never refers to an archangel named "Jesus". Hurtado also states that the Apostle Paul clearly believed Jesus to have been a real man who lived on earth, and that the deities of pagan saviour cults, such as Isis and Osiris, were not transformed in their devotees' ideas from heavenly deities to actual people living on earth.

Similar criticisms were voiced by Simon Gathercole of Cambridge, who concludes that Carrier's arguments, and more broadly, the mythicist positions on different aspects of Paul's letters, are contradicted by the historical data, and that Paul's description of Jesus' life on Earth, his personality and family, tend to establish that Paul regarded Jesus as a natural person, rather than an allegorical figure. According to Christopher Hansen, Carrier's understanding of Romans 1:3 as meaning that Jesus was born in heaven by God from a "cosmic sperm bank" is not supported by the Jewish or Christian sources and not supported even by the scholars that Carrier cites to make his argument.

In addition, Carrier's counter-consensus thesis that the early reference to Christ in the Roman historian Tacitus was a Christian interpolation has been recently rejected by Willem Blom, who finds that Carrier's thesis relies on unconvincing silences and mistaken understandings of the 1st and 2nd centuries.

Bibliography
 Gesù resistente Gesù inesistente. Due visioni a confronto (with Fernando Bermejo-Rubio, Franco Tommasi & Robert M. Price, in Italian) (Manni, 2022) 
 Jesus from Outer Space: What the Earliest Christians Really Believed about Christ (Pitchstone Publishing, 2020) 
 On the Historicity of Jesus: Why We Might Have Reason for Doubt  (Sheffield Phoenix Press, 2014) 
  Hitler Homer Bible Christ: The Historical Papers of Richard Carrier 1995–2013  (Richmond, CA: Philosophy Press, 2014) 
  Proving History: Bayes's Theorem and the Quest for the Historical Jesus  (Amherst, NY: Prometheus Books, 2012) 
 Chapter: "How Not to Defend Historicity", in Bart Ehrman and the Quest of the Historical Jesus of Nazareth, (Cranford, NJ: American Atheist Press 2013) 
  Why I Am Not a Christian: Four Conclusive Reasons to Reject the Faith  (Philosophy Press, 2011) 
 Chapters: "Christianity's success was not incredible", "Neither life nor the universe appear intelligently designed", "Moral facts naturally exist (and science could find them)" in The End of Christianity edited by John W. Loftus (Amherst, NY: Prometheus Books 2011) .
 Not the Impossible Faith, Why Christianity Didn't Need a Miracle to Succeed  Lulu.com (2009) 
 Sense and Goodness without God: A Defense of Metaphysical Naturalism. AuthorHouse (2005) .

See also

 Criticism of the Bible
 Criticism of Christian origins
 List of atheist activists and educators

Footnotes

References

Sources

External links
 
 Richard Carrier's writings at Internet Infidels
 Westar Fellow 

1969 births
Living people
21st-century American historians
21st-century American male writers
American former Protestants
American Taoists
American atheism activists
Christ myth theory proponents
Columbia Graduate School of Arts and Sciences alumni
Historians of antiquity
Former Methodists
University of California, Berkeley alumni
20th-century atheists
21st-century atheists
American male non-fiction writers
Polyamorous people
American conspiracy theorists